Kingdom Swann is an historical novel by the reclusive English writer Miles Gibson, his fourth book, first published 1990 by William Heinemann, London, ISNM 0-434-29133-1, in paperback by Black Swan in 1991, and subsequently reprinted by the Do-Not Press, London, in 1998. It is a rambunctious satire on the dangerously thin line between art and pornography, fact and fantasy.  The protagonist, Kingdom Swann (1825-1916) is a late Victorian painter of classical nudes on an epic scale who, turning to the new-fangled camera to capture his subjects, finds himself recording the erotic fantasies of a generation. "As in Daniel Defoe's Roxana: The Fortunate Mistress, a voyeuristic fascination plays games with high morality," reported Sabine Durrant in The Times. The novel was adapted by David Nobbs as a feature-length drama Gentlemen's Relish for the BBC in 2001 starring Billy Connolly, Sarah Lancashire, and Douglas Henshall.

References

Novels by Miles Gibson
British satirical novels
English novels
1990 British novels
Novels about artists
British novels adapted into films
Heinemann (publisher) books